Brevibacillus is a genus of Gram-positive bacteria in the family Paenibacillaceae.

References

External links
 Todar's Online Textbook of Bacteriology
Brevibacillus at BacDive -  the Bacterial Diversity Metadatabase

Paenibacillaceae
Bacteria genera